Schizopygopsis kialingensis is a species of ray-finned fish. It is endemic to the Jialing River in Gansu Province, China. It grows to  SL.

References

Schizopygopsis
Freshwater fish of China
Endemic fauna of Gansu
Fish described in 1962